Sesheke Airport  is an airport in the town of Sesheke, Western Province, Zambia. It also serves the town of Katima Mulilo, across the Zambezi River in Namibia.

See also

Transport in Zambia
List of airports in Zambia

References

External links
OpenStreetMap - Sesheke Airfield
FallingRain - Sesheke Airport
OurAirports - Sesheke Airport

Airports in Zambia
Buildings and structures in Western Province, Zambia